Joshua Iginla (born 21 May 1969) is a Nigerian pastor, televangelist, and prosperity gospel preacher regarded by some as a prophet. He is the founder and senior pastor of the Champions Royal Assembly, a megachurch which meets in an 80,000 seat auditorium in Kubwa, Abuja, Nigeria.

Early life 
Iginla was born on 21 May 1969 to Muslim parents in Ado-Ekiti, Ekiti State. He later converted to Christianity and subsequently became a Pentecostal pastor and televangelist.

Personal life 
In 2019, Iginla told his congregation that he and his wife Yemisi had had extramarital affairs and had had children outside marriage. In an interview, Yemisi Iginla denied that she had had affairs, and in May 2020, Business Post reported that the couple had divorced and that Joshua Iginla had remarried to a South African.

Private jet 
In 2019, Iginla celebrated his birthday with a new private jet which the Nigerian daily newspaper Vanguard reported was necessary for his busy international preaching itinerary.

Controversies  
He had a public spat with Pastor Chris Okotie following the death of T.B. Joshua.

References 

Nigerian television evangelists
Prosperity theologians
1969 births
Living people
People from Ekiti State
Nigerian Pentecostal pastors
Prophets
Converts to Protestantism from Islam
Converts to Pentecostal denominations